Kyle Charles Letheren (born 26 December 1987) is a Welsh professional footballer and coach who is currently a player / goalkeeper coach for Hartlepool United.

He has played in the Scottish Premier League for Kilmarnock, in the Scottish Premiership for Dundee, and in the English Football League for Blackpool, Plymouth Argyle, Salford City and Morecambe.

Career

Early career
Letheren was born in Llanelli, Carmarthenshire. He began his career as a trainee at Swansea City, spending time on loan at Newport County in 2005. He did not make an appearance for the first-team before being released in the summer of 2006.

He subsequently joined Barnsley. Having arrived at Barnsley on a short-term deal, Letheren then signed a new deal to keep him at Oakwell until 2008 Two years after joining the club, he made his debut in the 3rd round of the FA Cup against Blackpool on 5 January 2008, as a half-time substitute, replacing the injured Heinz Müller. At 1–0 down 'the Tykes' went on to win the game 2–1, giving Letheren his first clean sheet on his debut. Barnsley that year went on to beat Liverpool & Chelsea and reached the FA Cup semi-finals.

He was loaned to Doncaster Rovers for the second half of the 2008–09 season as cover for veteran goalkeeper Neil Sullivan, but he did not make an appearance for them.

He was released from his contract in the summer of 2009 and then signed a short-term contract with Plymouth Argyle in the Championship to provide cover for Romain Larrieu.

On 31 December 2009, Letheren was released from Plymouth Argyle after his contract expired. In April 2010, he agreed to join Motherwell until the end of the season as an emergency goalkeeper, but the Scottish Premier League blocked the move as they were deemed to have enough goalkeepers. He remained at Fir Park to train with the squad for the remainder of the season.

Kilmarnock

Letheren signed for Kilmarnock in August 2010, to provide backup to Cammy Bell. Letheren failed to make an appearance for Kilmarnock in his first season, mostly down to the form of Bell. In 2011–12, he was handed his Scottish Premier League debut as a half time substitute for the injured Bell, ironically against Motherwell, at 0–0 and Kilmarnock went on to win the game 2–0. Later that year he was handed his full SPL debut away to Dunfermline Athletic, in a 2–1 win.

During the 2012–13 season, Cammy Bell suffered an injury leading to Letheren having a run in the first team. That run lasted until mid-October, when Bell returned. His second run in the first team came in early-February, when he played twice, he was involved in a 2–0 win over motherwell & in what was his last appearance for the club, a 1–1 draw against Inverness Caledonian Thistle.

With his contract due to expire at the end of the season, he left Kilmarnock by mutual consent in April 2013.

Dundee
After leaving Kilmarnock, Letheren was linked with a move to South African side Ajax Cape Town. Letheren went on trial with Dundee, with Manager John Brown saying he had done well. After making an appearance in a pre-season friendly, as a trialist, during which he suffered a thigh injury, it was then announced on 9 July 2013, that Letheren had signed a contract with Dundee.

Letheren played as first-choice goalkeeper for Dundee throughout all of the 2013–14 season. He was voted supporter's association Player of the Year after pulling off a match-winning save in the dying moment of the final game of the season to secure Dundee the Scottish Championship title. Letheren played the first ten matches at the start of the 2014–15 season before injuring his knee in a warm up against Motherwell. It was later announced that he would be out until December. After making his return against Partick Thistle and St Mirren, Letheren was once again sidelined after suffering an injury in the warm-up ahead of the Dundee derby against Dundee United, which allowed Arvid Schenk to take his place, although Schenk went on to concede six goals, in a 6–2 loss. Though he recovered from his injury, Letheren lost his first choice goalkeeper status to Scott Bain throughout the season. However, Letheren was given a chance to play the last three matches at the end of the season following Bain's injury.

At the end of the 2014–15 season, it was announced that Letheren was being released by the club upon the expiry of his contract. Following his release, Letheren was linked with a move to Championship club Bristol City. Letheren explained the reason for his release, saying he wanted regular first team football in the hope of securing a place in the national team.

Blackpool and York City

Letheren returned to England, agreeing a deal to join League One club Blackpool on 1 July 2015, signing a two-year contract, with an option for a further year.

Letheren's contract with Blackpool was terminated by mutual consent on 25 August 2016 in order for him to join National League club York City. He was signed shortly after York suspended goalkeeper Scott Flinders. On 21 May 2017, Letheren started as York beat Macclesfield Town 3–2 at Wembley Stadium in the 2017 FA Trophy Final. He was released at the end of 2016–17.

Plymouth Argyle and Salford City
Letheren re-signed for League One club Plymouth Argyle on 5 September 2017 on a free transfer. He made his first appearance for Argyle on 26 September, over eight years after he first signed for the club. He was offered a new contract by Plymouth at the end of the 2017–18 season.

He was again offered a new contract by Argyle at the end of the 2018–19 season, but turned it down after new manager Ryan Lowe stated he wanted to bring in a new goalkeeper whether Letheren stayed or not.

Letheren signed for newly promoted League Two club Salford City on 16 July 2019 on a one-year contract. He was released at the end of the 2019–20 season.

Chesterfield
On 28 August 2020, Letheren signed for National League side Chesterfield. On 24 January 2021, Letheren left the club by mutual consent.

Morecambe
On 26 January 2021, Letheren signed for League Two side Morecambe. In June 2021, following Morecambe’s promotion to League One, Letheren signed a one-year deal with the club. On 8 February 2022, Letheren left the Shrimps by mutual consent.

Hartlepool
On 16 June 2022, Letheren signed as player/goalkeeper coach for League Two side Hartlepool United.

International career
Letheren has represented Wales at schoolboy level and at under-21 level.

On 27 August 2014, Wales manager Chris Coleman announced his first UEFA Euro 2016 qualifying squad and Letheren was called up to the squad for their first qualifying match in Andorra after an impressive start to the 2014–15 season with Dundee in which he conceded just two goals in four league matches.

Personal life
He is the son of former Leeds United goalkeeper Glan Letheren.

Career statistics

Honours
Kilmarnock
Scottish League Cup: 2011–12

Dundee
Scottish Championship: 2013–14

York City
FA Trophy: 2016–17

Morecambe
EFL League Two play-offs: 2021

References

External links

1987 births
Living people
Footballers from Llanelli
Welsh footballers
Wales under-21 international footballers
Association football goalkeepers
Swansea City A.F.C. players
Newport County A.F.C. players
Barnsley F.C. players
Doncaster Rovers F.C. players
Plymouth Argyle F.C. players
Kilmarnock F.C. players
Dundee F.C. players
Blackpool F.C. players
York City F.C. players
Salford City F.C. players
Chesterfield F.C. players
Morecambe F.C. players
Hartlepool United F.C. players
National League (English football) players
Scottish Premier League players
Scottish Professional Football League players
English Football League players
Hartlepool United F.C. non-playing staff